Sam Groth and Adil Shamasdin were the defending champions but only Shamasdin chose to defend his title, partnering Frank Dancevic. Dancevic and Shamasdin withdrew in the semifinals.

Joris De Loore and Frederik Nielsen won the title after defeating Luis David Martínez and Filip Peliwo 6–4, 6–3 in the final.

Seeds

Draw

References
 Main Draw

Challenger Banque Nationale de Drummondville - Doubles
2018 Doubles